is a train station in Muroran, Hokkaidō, Japan.

Lines
Hokkaido Railway Company
Muroran Main Line Station H33

Adjacent stations

Railway stations in Hokkaido Prefecture
Railway stations in Japan opened in 1925